Vincenzo Paolino Della Pietra (born 22 June 2002) is an Italian footballer who plays as a forward for  club Monterosi on loan from Juve Stabia.

Career
He made his Serie B debut for Juve Stabia on 13 July 2020 in a game against Frosinone.

On 5 October 2020, he joined Genoa on loan. He spent the season with their Under-19 squad, not receiving any call-ups to the senior team.

On 3 January 2023, Della Pietra was loaned by Monterosi, with an option to buy.

Club statistics

References

2002 births
Living people
Sportspeople from the Province of Avellino
Footballers from Campania
Italian footballers
Association football forwards
Serie B players
Serie C players
S.S.C. Napoli players
Benevento Calcio players
S.S. Juve Stabia players
Genoa C.F.C. players
Monterosi Tuscia F.C. players